Rosemont station may refer to:

 Rosemont station (CTA), a Chicago "L" station
 Rosemont station (Metra), a commuter rail station in Rosemont, Illinois
 Rosemont station (Montreal Metro), a Montreal Metro station in the borough of Rosemont–La Petite-Patrie
 Rosemont station (SEPTA), a SEPTA Regional Rail station in Rosemont, Pennsylvania
 Roberts Road station, formerly Rosemont station, a SEPTA rapid transit station in Rosemont, Pennsylvania

See also
Rosemont (disambiguation)